HBO (Home Box Office) is an American pay television network owned by Warner Bros. Discovery. In correspondence, it may refer to:
 Home Box Office, Inc., a division of Warner Bros. Discovery which owns the brands of HBO and sister channel Cinemax
 HBO (international), a collection of HBO-branded cable and satellite TV networks, most of which are operated by Home Box Office, Inc. through regionally-based subsidiaries
 HBO Asia, a suite of Southeast Asian premium networks owned by Warner Bros. Discovery through HBO Asia Pte Ltd.
 HBO Latin America Group, a subsidiary of Warner Bros. Discovery that oversees a suite of Latin American premium networks
 HBO Brasil, a suite of Brasilian pay television networks owned by Warner Bros. Discovery through HBO Latin America Group
 HBO (Canadian TV channel), a multiplex channel of Bell Media-owned Canadian pay television network Crave operating under brand and program licensing agreements with Warner Bros. Discovery
 HBO Europe, a suite of pay television networks serving Central and Eastern Europe owned by Warner Bros. Discovery through Home Box Office, Inc.
 HBO Netherlands, a defunct Dutch premium television network owned by Home Box Office, Inc. and Ziggo, which operated from 2012 to 2016
 HBO Max, a U.S.-based over-the-top streaming service offering content from HBO and other Warner Bros. Discovery properties
 HBO Go, a deprecated U.S. and active international streaming service offering content from HBO to subscribers of the linear pay television channel
 HBO Now, a discontinued U.S.-based over-the-top streaming service offering content from HBO; formally referred to as "the HBO app" or as "the HBO streaming service" from August to December 2020

HBO may also refer to:
 Halo.Bungie.Org, a Halo fansite
 Hartung–Boothroyd Observatory, an observatory in Mount Pleasant, New York 
 Hoger beroepsonderwijs, higher applied education institutes in Flanders and the Netherlands
 Hollywood Bowl Orchestra
 Hyperbaric oxygen
 Oxoborane
 Ancient Hebrew language's ISO code
 HBO & Company, a company taken over by McKesson Corporation in 1999

See also
 Metaboric acid  (HBO2)